The 1880 Brown Bears football team represented Brown University in the 1880 college football season. The team lost its first game with Yale, the only match of the season.

Schedule

References

Brown
Brown Bears football seasons
College football winless seasons
Brown Bears football